Paul Koech (25 June 1969 – 3 September 2018) was a Kenyan distance and marathon runner. He participated at the IAAF World Half Marathon Championships in 1998 and finished in first place. He was also a regular competitor in the IAAF World Cross Country Championships with several top-5 positions.

He won the Parelloop 10K race in the Netherlands in 1999.

Personal life and death

Koech was an uncle of Sally Barsosio. He lived in Burnt Forest, Uasin Gishu District, Kenya.

He was married to Zipporah and had six children.

Koech died on 3 September 2018 at the age of 48.

References

External links

Kimbia Athletics

This is the wrong photo of Major Paul Koech. The photo appearing here is of Paul Kipsiele Koech, the 3,000m steeplechase veteran who is about 36 years old.

1969 births
2018 deaths
People from Uasin Gishu County
Kenyan male long-distance runners
Kenyan male marathon runners
Olympic athletes of Kenya
Athletes (track and field) at the 1996 Summer Olympics
World Athletics Championships athletes for Kenya
Place of death missing
World Athletics Half Marathon Championships winners
African Games bronze medalists for Kenya
African Games medalists in athletics (track and field)
Kenyan male cross country runners
Athletes (track and field) at the 1995 All-Africa Games